The CMLL World Middleweight Championship (Spanish: Campeonato Mundial de Peso Medio del CMLL) is a professional wrestling world championship promoted by the Mexican wrestling promotion Consejo Mundial de Lucha Libre (CMLL). While lighter weight classes are regularly ignored in wrestling promotions in the United States, with most emphasis placed on "heavyweights", more emphasis is placed on the lighter classes in Mexican companies. As it is a professional wrestling championship, it is not won via legitimate competition; it is instead won via a scripted ending to a match or on occasion awarded to a wrestler because of a storyline.

The championship is currently held by Dragón Rojo, Jr., who defeated Soberano Jr. for the title on April 2, 2022, at 79 Aniversario Arena Coliseo. Dragón Rojo Jr. is the longest reigning champion in the history of the championship. Since its creation in 1991, there have been 20 individual championship reigns shared between 16 wrestlers. El Dandy is the only three-time champion; he also has the shortest reign of any champion at 63 days.

History
The middleweight division was one of the first weight divisions in Mexican lucha libre to have a specific championship as the Mexican National Middleweight Championship was created in 1933. When the Mexican professional wrestling promotion Empresa Mexicana de Lucha Libre ("Mexican Wrestling Enterprise"; EMLL) was founded in September 1933, they became one of several Mexican promotions to promote the championship. EMLL later created the World Middleweight Championship to represent the highest level prize of the middleweight division, higher than the Mexican National Middleweight Championship. In 1952, EMLL joined the National Wrestling Alliance (NWA) and changed the title to the NWA World Middleweight Championship.

In the late 1980s, EMLL left the NWA over internal politics, and by 1991 they had changed their name to Consejo Mundial de Lucha Libre ("World Wrestling Council"; CMLL) to distance themselves from the NWA. At first, they continued to use the name "NWA World Middleweight Championship" as the name had originated with EMLL, but they soon created a series of CMLL-branded world championships, including the CMLL World Middleweight Championship, which became the third middleweight championship in the company. CMLL held a one-night, eight-man tournament to determine the first middleweight champion on December 18, 1991. The tournament final saw Blue Panther defeat El Satánico to become the first new titleholder.

In June 1992, many wrestlers left CMLL to join the newly formed Asistencia Asesoría y Administración ("Assistance, Assessment, and Administration"; AAA), which significantly affected CMLL's middleweight championships. The Mexico City Boxing and Wrestling Commission allowed AAA to assume control of the Mexican National Middleweight Championship as the reigning champion Octagón had joined AAA. Meanwhile, the CMLL World Middleweight Championship was vacated after the departure of the champion, Blue Panther. CMLL held a 16-man battle royal match to reduce the field to two finalists. El Dandy and Negro Casas survived the match, and a week later El Dandy defeated Casas to become the second CMLL World Middleweight Champion. The championship has not been vacant since then.

The exodus from CMLL to AAA also meant that CMLL lost control of the Mexican National Middleweight Championship as then-reigning champion Octagón was among the wrestlers that left the promotion. The Mexico City Boxing and Wrestling Commission allowed AAA to take control of the Mexican National Middleweight Championship at that point in time. On August 12, 2010, CMLL returned the NWA World Middleweight Championship to the NWA, but immediately replaced it with the NWA World Historic Middleweight Championship to keep two "world" level championships in the middleweight division.

On May 3, 2010, Jushin Thunder Liger defeated Negro Casas to win the CMLL World Middleweight Championship. The match took place in Fukuoka, Japan, which was the first time the championship changed hands outside of Mexico and also marked the first time a non-Mexican wrestler held the championship.

Reigns

Soberano Jr. is the current champion, having won the title on December 12, 2021	at CMLL Super Viernes. This is Soberano Jr.'s first reign as middleweight champion; he is the 20th overall champion. El Dandy holds the record for most CMLL World Middleweight Championship reigns with three and is one of only three wrestlers to hold the title more than once, the others being Negro Casas and Emilio Charles Jr. El Dandy also held the record for the shortest reignhis second lasted only 63 days.

Rules

In the 20th century, CMLL was generally consistent and strict about enforcing the actual weight limits, but in the 21st century the official definitions have at times been overlooked for certain champions.

With twelve CMLL-promoted championships labelled as "World" titles, the promotional focus shifts from championship to championship over time with no single championship consistently promoted as the "main" championship; instead CMLL's various major shows feature different weight divisions and are most often headlined by a Lucha de Apuestas ("Bet match") instead of a championship match. From 2013 until June 2016, only two major CMLL shows have featured championship matches: Sin Salida in 2013 and the 2014 Juicio Final show featuring the NWA World Historic Welterweight Championship. Championship matches usually take place under best two-out-of-three falls rules. On occasion, single-fall title matches have taken place, especially when promoting CMLL title matches in Japan, conforming to the traditions of the local promotion, illustrated by Jushin Thunder Liger winning the championship during New Japan Pro-Wrestling's Wrestling Dontaku 2010 in a single-fall match.

Tournaments

1991
In 1991, CMLL held an eight-man, one-night tournament to crown the first ever CMLL World Middleweight Champion. In the end, Blue Panther won the championship by defeating El Satánico.

1992
Due to a large number of wrestlers leaving the company in the summer of 1992, the middleweight championship was vacated, forcing CMLL to hold a tournament. They opted to start out with a 16-man battle royal elimination match as a means to qualify for the final match the following week. Negro Casas and El Dandy outlasted a field of wrestlers that consisted of Guerrero Maya, Águila Solitaria, Ponzona, Guerrero del Futuro, Plata, Espectro de Ultratumba, Espectro Jr., Oro, Javier Cruz, Kung Fu, Kato Kung Lee, Ringo Mendoza, Bestia Salvaje and Último Dragón. The following week El Dandy defeated Casas to start his first of three championship reigns.

Footnotes

References

External links
 Official CMLL Website

Consejo Mundial de Lucha Libre championships
Middleweight wrestling championships
World professional wrestling championships